Sky Manor Airport  is a privately owned, public use airport located eight nautical miles (9 mi, 15 km) west of the central business district of Jacksonville, a city in Onslow County, North Carolina, United States.

Facilities and aircraft 
Sky Manor Airport covers an area of 25 acres (10 ha) at an elevation of 60 feet (18 m) above mean sea level. It has one runway designated 8/26 with a turf surface measuring 3,610 by 85 feet (1,100 x 26 m).

For the 12-month period ending July 5, 2010, the airport had 600 general aviation aircraft operations, an average of 50 per month. At that time there were five single-engine aircraft based at this airport.

References

External links 
 

Airports in North Carolina
Transportation in Onslow County, North Carolina